A bailout is an act of loaning or giving capital to an entity that is in danger of failing.

When written as two words—bail out—it commonly refers to:
 Bail out, to  secure the release of an arrested person by providing bail money
 Bail out (or bale out), to exit an aircraft while in flight, using a parachute

Bailout may also refer to:

 Bailout (film), an unmade film that was to star Jack Black, circa 2011
 "Bailout" (Parks and Recreation), a 2013 episode on the American television show Parks and Recreation
 Bailout at 43,000, a 1957 American drama film
 Bailout: The Age of Greed, previous name of the 2013 film Assault on Wall Street
 Bailout! The Game, a board game created in 2008
 Bailout bottle, an emergency gas cylinder carried by a diver

See also
 "Bale Out", a satirical dance remix by American composer Lucian Piane